Franck Briffaut (born March 10, 1958 in Paris) is a French politician.

He was born on 10 March 1958. He has been the mayor of Villers-Cotterêts since 2014.

Briffaut has been married twice and is the father of two children.

References 

1958 births
French politicians
Living people